The Asociación Nacional de Fútbol Amateur (National Association of Amateur Football), locally known by its abbreviation ANFA, is the governing body of Chilean football on amateur level, and along with Asociación Nacional de Fútbol Profesional (ANFP), who is responsible for the professional counterpart, they made the Chilean Football Federation.

Its functions are to organize and promote the amateur football in Chile.

It is responsible for organizing the Chilean Tercera División A, the fourth level competition in Chilean football, and the Chilean Tercera División B, the fifth level competition, as well as the 345 Local Associations, located in 15 different Regional Associations.
They also organize the Campeonato Nacional Amateur de Clubes Campeones, and the Campeonato Nacional Amateur de Asociaciones (at Adult and Youth levels).

Campeonato Nacional Amateur de Clubes Campeones ANFA

Winners

1988 - Arturo Prat (Hualañé, Maule)
1989 - Unión Bellavista (Antofagasta, Antofagasta)
1990 - Independiente (Cauquenes,  Maule)
1991 - C.C.U. (Antofagasta, Antofagasta)
1992 - Lintz (Puerto Montt, Los Lagos)
1993 - Coloso (Arica, Tarapacá)
1994 - Unión Pacífico (Constitución, Maule)
1995 - Santos (Temuco, Araucanía)
1996 - Julio Juárez (El Pinar, Santiago)
1997 - Estrella del Sur (Castro, Los Lagos)
1998 - Cardenal Caro (Pichilemu, O'Higgins)

1999 - Unión Católica (Nogales, Valparaíso)
2000 - Arauco (Osorno, Los Lagos)
2001 - Cardenal Caro (Pichilemu, O'Higgins)
2002 - Población Balmaceda (José María Caro, Santiago)
2003 - Huracán (Concepción, Biobío)
2004 - Unión Compañía (Unión Esperanza, O'Higgins)
2005 - Unión Wanderers (General Lagos, Los Ríos)
2006 - IRFE (Santa Cruz, O'Higgins)
2007 - Estrella (Graneros, O'Higgins)
2008 - Lord Cochrane (Concepción, Biobío)
2009 - Estrella (Graneros, O'Higgins)

2010 - Paniahue (Santa Cruz, O'Higgins)
2011 - Paniahue (Santa Cruz, O'Higgins)
2012 - Juventud Varsovia (Cardenal Caro, Santiago)
2013 - Deportivo Escondida (Antofagasta, Antofagasta)
2014 - Atlético Balmaceda (San Antonio, Valparaíso)
2015 - Paniahue (Santa Cruz, O'Higgins)
2016 - Juventud Unida (Dalcahue, Los Lagos)
2017 - Unión Bellavista (Coquimbo, Coquimbo)
2018 - Población Los Nogales (Estación Central, Santiago)
2019 - Unión Bellavista (Coquimbo, Coquimbo)
2020 - Cóndor (Pichidegua, O'Higgins)

Campeonato Nacional Amateur de Asociaciones ANFA

Winners

1912 - Antofagasta
1913 - Antofagasta / Santiago
1914 - Santiago
1915 - Talcahuano / Santiago
1916 - Talcahuano / Valparaíso
1917 - Zona Sur / Zona Central
1920 - Zona Sur
1924 - Zona Sur / Zona Central
1926 - Zona Norte
1927 - IV Zona (Aconcagua Valparaíso)
1928 - VI Zona (Colchagua Maule)
1930 - Iquique / Concepción
1931 - Santiago
1934 - Lota
1935 - San Enrique (Iquique)
1937 - Iquique
1938 - Valparaíso

1939 - Pedro de Valdivia
1941 - Pedro de Valdivia
1943 - Iquique
1945 - Concepción
1947 - Iquique
1949 - La Serena
1951 - La Serena
1953 - La Serena
1955 - Iquique
1957 - Peñaflor
1959 - Calama
1961 - Chuquicamata
1963 - Peñaflor 
1966 - Alejo Barrios (Valparaíso)
1968 - Valparaíso
1970 - Antofagasta
1972 - Antofagasta

1974 - Castro
1976 - Peñaflor
1978 - Iquique
1980 - Punta Arenas
1982 - Puerto Montt
1984 - Pichilemu
1989 - Rengo
1993 - Quilpué
1996 - Rengo
2000 - Illapel
2003 - Castro 
2005 - Santa Cruz
2008 - Punta Arenas
2011 - Cardenal Caro (Santiago)
2014 - Villa San Agustín (Talca)
2017 - Castro
2020 - Tocopilla

References

External links
Official website
Organization Commission of Tercera División

Association football governing bodies in Chile
Sports organizations established in 1985
1985 establishments in Chile